Robert M. Prenter, Jr. was a California State Assemblyman from 1996 to 1998.

Personal life
Prenter was born in Harbor City, California on January 23, 1965. He married Natasha Fooman in 2003.

Political career
He was elected to the State Assembly after defeating former Assembly Speaker Brian Setencich in the Republican primary (who ran as a write-in candidate in the general election). Prenter was defeated for reelection in 1998 by Dean Florez.
Prenter's initial campaign was largely funded by the conservative California Independent Business PAC, principally backed by his uncle, religious radio network owner Edward G. Atsinger III. Atsinger is one of the founders of Salem Communications.  The campaign was managed by Southern California-based political operative Jane Carroll.

References

1965 births
Living people
Republican Party members of the California State Assembly
People from Harbor City, Los Angeles